Marcus Antonius Pallas (died AD 62) was a prominent Greek freedman and secretary during the reigns of the Roman Emperors Claudius and Nero. His younger brother was Marcus Antonius Felix, a procurator of Iudaea Province. According to Tacitus, Pallas and Felix descended from the Greek Kings of Arcadia.

Pallas was originally a slave of Antonia Minor, a daughter of Mark Antony and niece of Emperor Augustus. In accordance with Roman custom, Pallas took the name of her father when freed. Josephus mentions him as the slave sent by Antonia to deliver evidence to the emperor Tiberius concerning the murder of his son Drusus Julius Caesar by Sejanus. Antonia probably manumitted Pallas between the years of 31 and 37, when he would have passed the minimum age for freedom. He is listed as owning land in Egypt during that period, possibly as a reward for his servitude. When Antonia died in 37, he became the client of her son, Claudius, as tradition dictated at the death of a former master and patron.

As a freedman, Pallas rose to great heights in the imperial government. From the beginning of Claudius' reign, the Senate was openly hostile to him, which forced him to centralize powers. The daily maintenance of the empire was too much for one man, so Claudius divided it up among his trusted freedmen. Pallas was made secretary of the treasury. He did this job with such efficiency that Cornelius Scipio proposed before the Senate that he be rewarded. The position apparently enabled Pallas to reward himself as well, and was rewarded by the Senate of 15 million sesterces; he is cited by Tacitus to have a personal fortune of 300 million sesterces as he is later listed as one of the richest men of the time by Pliny the Elder. Historians  acknowledge that he never embezzled directly from the imperial account, and his wealth may have come from his financial acumen. Some ancient historians claim he was able to control the emperor through his high-ranking position, but this is probably not the case. This is shown when he could not prevent his fellow freedman-administrator Polybius from being executed for treason.

In the second half of Claudius' reign, Pallas chose to support Agrippina the Younger as the new empress after the fall of Empress Messalina. Tacitus notes his intent to reunite the Julian and Claudian families through the marriage, and prevent either a future husband of Agrippina, or Agrippina herself, from claiming the throne. But the ancient authors also state that the real reason for his choice was that Pallas and Agrippina were lovers. 

Modern historians suggest that their relationship was strictly business, and they helped each other with mutual goals. Pallas' influence on Agrippina was real and became well-known, but he continued to advise Claudius on matters of state. He was the source of a law that stated that a free woman who married a slave would remain free if the master approved.

According to Tacitus, Tiberius Claudius Narcissus, another powerful freedman at the court, hoped to bring down Agrippina by revealing her alleged affair with Pallas, which would also have undermined the position of her son Nero. Narcissus had allied himself with Britannicus, Nero's principal competitor for the succession. When Nero succeeded Claudius, Narcissus was arrested and executed. Pallas retained his position in the treasury for a time. It has been suggested that he assisted Agrippina in murdering Claudius since he was sure of his future security but this security did not last long. In 55, Nero dismissed Pallas from service, tired of having to deal with any allies of Agrippina. 

He further accused Pallas of conspiring to overthrow him and place Faustus Sulla, the husband of Claudius' daughter Claudia Antonia, on the throne. Seneca, who was prominent in Nero's circle, came to Pallas' defense at the trial and facilitated his  acquittal. 

Pallas did not elude Nero's wrath forever, and was killed on Nero's orders in 62 -- possibly to gain access to his large fortune, part of which was his by right as Pallas' official patron. Some money must have gone to Pallas' family, as a descendant of his became consul in 167.

Pallas is a character in Robert Graves' novel I, Claudius; in the TV series, he is portrayed by Bernard Hepton.

References

Sources
Oost, S.V. "The Career of M. Antonius Pallas." American Journal of Philology 79 (1958). 113–139.

1st-century Romans
Emperor's slaves and freedmen
Antonii
1st-century Greek people